The Fern Ridge Wildlife Area is a wildlife management area located west of Eugene, Oregon, in the United States.  It is named for the Fern Ridge Reservoir which it partially surrounds.

References 

Protected areas of Lane County, Oregon
Oregon state wildlife areas
Protected areas established in 1957
1957 establishments in Oregon